Aliabad-e Farhang (also Romanized as ‘Alīābād-e Farhang; also known as Kalāteh-ye Farhang) is a village in Fakhrud Rural District, Qohestan District, Darmian County, South Khorasan Province, Iran. At the 2006 census, its population was 27, in 10 families.

References 

Populated places in Darmian County